SS Widget was a diesel tugboat that operated on the Arrow Lakes in British Columbia, Canada. She was built by Ivan Horie in Vancouver, British Columbia in 1948.

She was chartered by the Canadian Pacific Railway company to fill in until a replacement for SS Columbia (1920-1947), which had a damaged hull, could be acquired. Widget was only used from February 1, 1948 to late April of that year.

References

Steamboats of the Arrow Lakes
Ships built in British Columbia
Canadian Pacific Railway
1948 ships